The Bibliothèque de Genève (BGE, English: Geneva Library, Library of Geneva), founded in 1559, was known as Bibliothèque publique et universitaire (BPU, English: Public and University Library) from 1907 to 2006.

It also manages the library in Villa La Grange.

It focuses on the humanities and the social sciences with special emphasis on the Reformation, the Enlightenment and Genevensia (i.e. anything published in Geneva or whose author or subject is connected to Geneva).

History 

Geneva has one of the oldest legal deposit systems in the world, dating from 1539, with all Genevan publications originally being deposited with a Chambre des comptes. John Calvin created the library twenty years later to serve the Académie in what is now Collège Calvin. The earliest mention of the library goes back to 1562.

In 1720, the Genevan theologian Ami Lullin acquired the Petau collection of illuminated manuscripts and left it to the library in 1756.

In 1872, the library moved to its current building in Parc des Bastions alongside Uni Bastions.

The Institut et Musée Voltaire was founded in 1954, Geneva's music library, now called La Musicale, in 1962, and the Centre d'iconographie in 1993.

In 1999, the library was added to the Swiss Inventory of Cultural Property of National and Regional Significance.

The main site (Bastions)

Books 
In 2014, there were more than two million print volumes in the library's collections. Since the 20th century, the library has focused on the humanities and social sciences. Many of its incunable and other early modern books are available on e-rara.ch.

Manuscripts 
As well as 1,500 papyri and 380 medieval manuscripts, the Bibliothèque de Genève holds the papers of such Geneva personalities as John Calvin, Jean-Jacques Rousseau, Horace-Bénédict de Saussure, Édouard Naville, Emile Jaques-Dalcroze and Nicolas Bouvier. Some of these manuscripts are available on e-codices.ch.

See also

Maps 
The map collection was begun in 1893, when the Genevan cartographer , who drew most of the maps for Élisée Reclus's Nouvelle Géographie universelle, gave approximately 7,000 items to the library. It now has about 45,000 maps, dating from the 16th to the mid-20th century.

Maps of the city and canton of Geneva are kept at the Centre d'iconographie. The evolution of Geneva over the centuries can be seen on the GE200.ch website using some of these maps.

Posters 
The library began collecting posters in 1851 and now has about 130,000. The collection documents life in Geneva, focusing on advertising, culture, social life, tourism and politics, including the struggles of the 1930s and protests from the 1960s and 1970s.

Musée Voltaire 

The Musée Voltaire, previously known as the Institut et Musée Voltaire, is both a museum and a library devoted to Voltaire and the 18th century. It is located on Geneva's right bank, in the Délices area. The museum has works by Jean Huber, Jean-Antoine Houdon, Hans Erni and others. The library has a significant number of manuscripts and 22,000 volumes, to be read in the reading room (not for loan).

La Musicale 

La Musicale, previously known as the Bibliothèque musicale de la ville de Genève, is Geneva's specialist music library, open to all. It is located near the Conservatoire, the Victoria Hall and the Grand Théâtre, on the first floor of the Maison des arts du Grütli. It has about 50,000 music scores (classical, jazz, rock, world music...), as well as relevant books and journals, and posters and concert programmes going back to the 19th century.

Centre d'iconographie 

The Centre d'iconographie, previously known as the Centre d'iconographie de la ville de Genève or CIG, is an archive of about 4 million images, primarily of the city and canton of Geneva and the surrounding area, though not exclusively. It includes, for example, photos by the Genevan photographer Frédéric Boissonnas of the Balkans, Greece and North Africa. It is located near the Boulevard du Pont-d'Arve. Its collections are included in the Swiss Inventory of Cultural Property of National and Regional Significance.

Bibliothèque La Grange 

The private library of Guillaume Favre (1770-1851) contains about 5,600 works, in over 12,000 volumes, on history, literature and ancient languages, still in their original setting in Parc La Grange. They may be consulted in the main Bastions site of the Bibliothèque de Genève. Tours of the library are held each year in May.

See also

 David le Boiteux
 Charles-Moïse Briquet

References

Further reading

External links 

 The Bibliothèque de Genève website
 Early books on e-rara.ch 
 Catalogue of papyri  
 Medieval manuscripts on e-codices.ch 
 Maps on Réro doc 
 Digitised images from the Centre d'iconographie

Public libraries
Research libraries
Music libraries
Libraries in Switzerland
Cultural venues in Geneva
Education in Geneva
Tourist attractions in Geneva
Libraries established in 1559
1559 establishments in Europe